Primicaris is genus of Cambrian arthropod from the Chengjiang biota of China and the Burgess Shale of Canada. It contains a single described species, P. larvaformis.

Description 
Specimens range from 2.08 to 6.04 mm in length. The undivided subovate-shaped dorsal shield covered the entire body, and wrapped around the front edge of the carapace, forming a doublure structure. The midline of the carapace exhibited thickening. There is a pair of uniramous antennae, as well as ten pairs of biramous limbs. The exopods of these limbs are flagellate and bear setae, with the exopods decreasing in size posteriorly.

Taxonomy 
Its specimens were once thought to be meraspids of Naraoia spinosa. Its phylogenetic position has been described as "problematic". Recent studies have suggested them to be marrellomorphs belonging to the subgroup Acercostraca.

See also

 Arthropod
 Cambrian explosion
 Chengjiang biota
 List of Chengjiang Biota species by phylum

References

Cambrian animals
Maotianshan shales fossils
Prehistoric arthropod genera

Cambrian genus extinctions